Ofelia Garcia may refer to:
 Ofelia Garcia (artist), Cuban-born American artist
 Ofelia García (educator), linguist